San Pedro de Huacarpana District is one of eleven districts of the province Chincha in Peru.

References

1951 establishments in Peru
States and territories established in 1951